The fifth season of the French version of Dancing with the Stars  premiered on TF1 on September 27, 2014, almost one year to the day after the fourth season. This time, 11 celebrities were paired with 11 professional ballroom dancers, more than the 10 of the previous two seasons. Sandrine Quétier and Vincent Cerutti return as the hosts for this season, while second season winner Shy'm left her judging chair after two years, being replaced by first season winner M. Pokora.

Participants
After months of speculation, the full cast was leaked by the media on July 25, 2014. TF1 confirmed the participations of Nathalie Péchalat on September 3 and Corneille on September 4, revealing which dancers the two would be paired with along the way. The rest of the cast was confirmed by the channel on September 9, along with the premiere date and their respective partners were revealed during a press conference the next day.

David Carreira was announced by the media, but it turned out he was actually participating in the Portuguese version of the program. Of the celebrities participating, Corneille had already been in talks for the previous season while Elisa Tovati had turned down all four previous seasons. In a June 2014 interview, Joyce Jonathan strongly denied her participation, lying that it "wasn't in the cards." Several celebrities, including singers Jean-Pascal Lacoste and Hélène Rollès, confirmed having been approached by TF1 but weren't part of the final cast.

Scoring

Red numbers indicate the couples with the lowest score for each week.
Blue numbers indicate the couples with the highest score for each week.
 indicates the couples eliminated that week.
 indicates the returning couple that finished in the bottom two.
 indicates the winning couple.
 indicates the runner-up couple.
 indicates the third place couple.

Averages 
This table only counts dances scored on the traditional 40-point scale. Starting from week 3, both technical and artistic scores are tallied.

Highest and lowest scoring performances
The best and worst performances in each dance according to the judges' marks are as follows (starting from week 3, an average between technical and artistic score is used):

Couples' Highest and lowest scoring performances
According to the traditional 40-point scale. (starting from week 3, an average between technical and artistic score is used):

Styles, scores and songs

Week 1 

 Individual judges scores in the chart below (given in parentheses) are listed in this order from left to right: Jean-Marc Généreux, Marie-Claude Pietragalla, Matt Pokora, Chris Marques.

Running order

Week 2 : Personal Story Week 

 Individual judges scores in the chart below (given in parentheses) are listed in this order from left to right: Jean-Marc Généreux, Marie-Claude Pietragalla, Matt Pokora, Chris Marques.

Running order

Week 3 : New Dances Week 

 Individual judges scores in the chart below (given in parentheses) are listed in this order from left to right: Jean-Marc Généreux, Marie-Claude Pietragalla, Matt Pokora, Chris Marques.

Running order

Week 4 : Idol Week 

 Individual judges scores in the chart below (given in parentheses) are listed in this order from left to right: Jean-Marc Généreux, Marie-Claude Pietragalla, Matt Pokora, Chris Marques.

Running order

Week 5 : Partner Switch-Up 

 Individual judges scores in the chart below (given in parentheses) are listed in this order from left to right: Jean-Marc Généreux, Marie-Claude Pietragalla, Matt Pokora, Chris Marques.

The couples were required to switch professional partners this week and learn a new style of dance. Due to the nature of the week, no elimination took place at the end of the show.

Running order

Week 6 : Dance Marathon 

 Individual judges scores in the chart below (given in parentheses) are listed in this order from left to right: Jean-Marc Généreux, Marie-Claude Pietragalla, Matt Pokora, Chris Marques.

Due to rules, two eliminations took place at the end of the show.

Due to personal reasons Grégoire Lyonnet has left the show.

The Dance Marathon: couples must dance as long as possible until the disposal by judges. The first elimination is assigned 5 points, second – 10 points and so on until the last 40 points for the winner. Three completely different dances are jive, flamenco and country.

Running order

Week 7: Dance Fusion Week 

 Individual judges scores in the chart below (given in parentheses) are listed in this order from left to right: Jean-Marc Généreux, Marie-Claude Pietragalla, Matt Pokora, Chris Marques.

Running order

Week 8: Shameful songs 

 Individual judges scores in the chart below (given in parentheses) are listed in this order from left to right: Jean-Marc Généreux, Marie-Claude Pietragalla, Matt Pokora, Chris Marques.

Running order

Week 9: Dance trio week 

 Individual judges scores in the chart below (given in parentheses) are listed in this order from left to right: Jean-Marc Généreux, Marie-Claude Pietragalla, Matt Pokora, Chris Marques.

Running order

Week 10: Finals 

 Individual judges scores in the chart below (given in parentheses) are listed in this order from left to right: Jean-Marc Généreux, Marie-Claude Pietragalla, Matt Pokora, Chris Marques.

Running order

Dance Chart
The celebrities and professional partners danced one of these routines for each corresponding week.
 Week 1 : Cha-Cha-Cha, Contemporary dance, Foxtrot, Jive, Rumba or Tango
 Week 2 : American Smooth, Cha-Cha-Cha, Foxtrot, Pasodoble, Rumba, Samba or Tango  (Personal Story week)
 Week 3 : Afro Jazz, Ballet, Bharata Natyam, Bolero, Country, Flamenco, Hip Hop or Lindy Hop (New Dances week)
 Week 4 : Cha-Cha-Cha, Jive, Lindy Hop, Quickstep, Rumba, Samba or Waltz (Idol week)
 Week 5 : Contemporary dance, Foxtrot, Quickstep, Samba or Tango (Partner Switch-Up week)
 Week 6 : American Smooth, Jive, Quickstep, Rumba, Samba or Tango (Dance Marathon week)
 Week 7 : Contemporary dance, Charleston, Foxtrot, Pasodoble, Rumba, Samba, Tango or Waltz (Dance Fusion week)
 Week 8 : American Smooth, Cha-Cha-Cha, Contemporary dance, Jive, Pasodoble, Quickstep, Salsa, Tango or Waltz (Shameful Songs week)
 Week 9 : Cha-Cha-Cha, Foxtrot, Jive, Pasodoble, Rumba, Salsa, Tango  (Semi-finals)
 Week 10 : Charleston, Waltz, Jive, Rumba, Contemporary dance, American Smooth, Samba, Freestyle (Finals)

 Highest scoring dance
 Lowest scoring dance
 Danced, but not scored

Musical Guests

France television ratings

References

Season 05
2014 French television seasons